Zafarabad Junction railway station is the railway station in Jaunpur district, Uttar Pradesh. Its code is ZBD. It serves Zafarabad town. The station consists of four platforms.

Nearby station Jaunpur jn., Jaunpur city, Sirkoni and Kajgaon

Zafarabad Junction is a medium revenue station, serving over 5000 passengers and over 8 trains on daily basis. It is under the administrative control  
of the Northern Railway Zone's Lucknow railway division, and partially of the North Eastern Railway zone's Varanasi railway division.
Zafarabad Junction is well connected with many important  cultural cities such as Delhi, Ahmedabad, Mumbai, kolkata, Jammu, Dehradun, and Amritsar.

Trains 

Some of the trains that run from Zafarabad are:

 Jaunpur–Rae Bareli Express
 Godaan Express
 Howrah–Amritsar Express
 Suhaildev Superfast Express
 Doon Express
 Faizabad Superfast Express
 Varanasi–Bareilly Express
 Sabarmati Express
 Marudhar Express (via Sultanpur)
 Faizabad–Mughalsarai Passenger
 Ghazipur City–Varanasi DEMU
 Varanasi–Sultanpur Passenger
 Farakka Express (via Faizabad)
 Farakka Express (via Sultanpur)
 Prayag–Jaunpur Passenger
 BSB SLN Passenger
 BSB LKO Passenger

See also 
 Kerakat railway station
 Varanasi Junction railway station
 Ghazipur City railway station
 Varanasi–Sultanpur–Lucknow line

References

External links 

 ZBD/Zafarabad Junction
Zafarabad Junction Railway Station

Lucknow NR railway division
Railway stations in Jaunpur district
Railway junction stations in Uttar Pradesh